Vera Krasova (Russian: Вера Красова; born December 11, 1987 in Moscow, Soviet Union) is a Russian model and beauty queen. She competed in the 2007 Miss Russia pageant on December 14 where she represented Moscow. Vera made it to the top-3 contestants and placed as the 1st runner-up to the eventual winner Ksenia Sukhinova. Although she wasn't the winner of the national pageant, Miss Russia organization decided to send her to Miss Universe 2008 pageant held in Nha Trang, Vietnam. She reached the top 5 and placed 3rd runner-up, and was the only top 5 contestant to not be from Latin America. This was the first time Russia finished in the Top 5 of Miss Universe since Oxana Fedorova in 2002.

References

1987 births
Living people
Miss Universe 2008 contestants
Female models from Moscow
Russian beauty pageant winners
Russian women television presenters